The Gardens is a neighbourhood in the Jebel Ali district of Dubai, United Arab Emirates.

History
The Gardens community is in the northeast part of the Jebel Ali Village area. The original Jebel Ali Village was constructed in 1977 to provide accommodation to construction contractors' staff. At this time, Sheikh Rashid bin Saeed Al Maktoum planned to develop Jebel Ali into an industrial area with its own airport (now Al Maktoum International Airport to the south), port (now the Port of Jebel Ali), and township (now Jebel Ali). The area was effectively a small British-style garden city and a project of Sir William Halcrow and Partners.

In later development by Nakheel Properties, the first residents moved into properties in The Gardens during August 2001, with space for 10,000 residents in landscaped grounds.

Location
The location is served by The Gardens metro station, a Dubai Metro station on the Route 2020 branch of the Red Line for Expo 2020.

There are around 286 houses and 129 low-rise apartment buildings. It lies between Discovery Gardens to the northeast, the main Jebel Ali Village area to the south, and Sheikh Zayed Road to the northwest. Ibn Battuta Mall is a large themed shopping mall immediately adjacent to the northwest of The Garden, with its own metro station.

The Winchester School and the Dubai branch of the Delhi Private School are located on the southwest side of the neighbourhood. The Gardens Cricket Ground is also located here. The Omar Bin Abdul Aziz Mosque is on the edge of The Gardens to the north. Foxes have been found in the area.

See also
 Discovery Gardens
 Jebel Ali

References

https://dubaiclean.com/
https://www.hellocleaner.ae/

External links
 

2001 establishments in the United Arab Emirates
Communities in Dubai
Nakheel Properties